Robert William Smith (born 14 March 1944) is an English former footballer and football manager. He was capped by England at Schoolboys and Youth level. He is the son of Conway Smith and grandson of Billy Smith, from whom he gets his middle name.

A reserve player for Manchester United, he moved on to Scunthorpe United in 1965, where he established himself in the first team. Moving on to Grimsby Town in 1967, he transferred to Brighton & Hove Albion the following year. In 1971, he signed with Hartlepool United via Chester, before he finished his playing career with Bury in 1973.

Appointing as Bury's manager in 1973, he led the club to promotion out of the Football League Fourth Division in 1973–74, before he was sacked in November 1977. Quickly installed as Port Vale manager, he moved on to Swindon Town the following year, having failed to prevent the club from suffering relegation. Despite some promising league campaigns and cup runs he was sacked in October 1980. Spending time as a coach at Blackpool, he returned to management in 1985 with Newport County, as the club were in financial meltdown; he departed the following year. Remaining in the game as a coach at Cardiff City, Hereford United, and Swansea City, he was appointed manager at Swansea in 1995. However, he resigned after less than three months in charge, and took up a role in the back-room staff at Sheffield Wednesday.

Club career
Smith began his career with Manchester United, turning professional in April 1961. He made over 200 appearances for the United reserve team, but Matt Busby did not give him his First Division debut. Smith left Old Trafford in March 1965 to join Scunthorpe United. Under Fred Goodwin, the "Iron" finished the 1964–65 campaign in 18th place in the Third Division. They rose to fourth in 1965–66, still 12 points short of a promotion place, before they dropped to 18th in 1966–67.

Smith moved to Grimsby Town, for a fee of £8,000, but failed to prevent Don McEvoy's "Mariners" from slipping into the Fourth Division in 1967–68. Smith remained in the Third Division, signing with Freddie Goodwin's Brighton & Hove Albion in June 1968. The "Seagulls" finished 12th in 1968–69, before rising to fifth in 1969–70, only five points shy of the promotion places. Goodwin chided the Goldstone Ground supporters for barracking Smith in January 1970, writing in the matchday programme that "he has done nothing to warrant this behaviour". Brighton dropped down to 14th-place in 1970–71 under Pat Saward.

In June 1971, Smith signed with Ken Roberts's Chester on a free transfer. He moved to Hartlepool United – initially on loan – in October of that year. Both teams struggled at the foot of the Football League, with Len Ashurst's "Pools" finishing just above the re-election places in 1971–72 and 1972–73. In August 1973, he moved to Bury as player-coach, but failed to appear in their league side.

International career
Smith won six caps for England Schoolboys and played twice for the England youth-team: in a 1–0 loss to the Netherlands in Utrecht on 9 March 1961, and a 2–0 defeat to West Germany in Flensburg three days later.

Style of play
Smith was a tough-tackling midfielder with aggression but limited technical skill.

Managerial and coaching career

Bury
Smith began his managerial career with Bury in November 1973, taking over from Allan Brown. At the age of 29 he was the youngest manager in the Football League. He had initial success, guiding Bury to promotion from the Fourth Division in the fourth automatic place at the end of the 1973–74 season. He stabilised the Gigg Lane outfit in the Third Division in 1974–75 with a 14th-place finish. They went on to finish 13th in 1975–76, before finishing five points off the promotion places in 1976–77. He was sacked by Bury on 16 November 1977 after a poor start to the season. The "Shakers" finished the 1977–78 campaign in 15th place under the stewardship of Bob Stokoe.

Port Vale
A day after leaving Bury he was appointed as manager of Port Vale. He replaced club legend Roy Sproson, and was given a large war chest to spend after a successful lottery scheme was set up at Vale Park. He took over with the club in 21st place in the Third Division. His first game in charge was a 0–0 draw with Midland Counties League side Arnold in the First Round of the FA Cup. In January, veteran defender Graham Hawkins was signed as a player-coach from Blackburn Rovers for £6,000. Forward Neville Chamberlain also joined the club as a professional, becoming the club's first black pro. John Froggatt also joined the club, signing from Colchester United for £10,000. Chairman Arthur McPherson celebrated this abandonment of frugality by declaring "we are going places". Local journalist Chris Harper slated the board for their decisions, calling them 'berserk'. Froggatt scored fifteen seconds into his debut in a 4–0 win over Exeter City. However this would be as good as it got for both Froggatt and Vale that season. In February, Vale beat Fort Lauderdale Strikers in a friendly, but also started a five games sequence without a win. Ged Stenson arrived the next month from Everton for a 'bargain' £3,000, and John Lumsdon joined on loan from Stoke City. Vale improved, and were unbeaten in six of their seven March games, with Chamberlain scoring on his debut. Yet on 28 March they started a club-record streak of twelve home games without a win that would continue into the following season. Encouragement came from the youth side, who reached the Quarter Finals of the FA Youth Cup. With four games to go, Vale were one point clear of the drop, however by losing all of their remaining games the "Valiants" ended the 1977–78 season in 21st place and were relegated into the Fourth Division. Smith was appointed as manager of Swindon Town in May 1978, with the club having to pay a compensation fee of £10,500 to Port Vale. His assistant, Dennis Butler, stayed on at the club and was appointed as his successor.

Swindon Town
Despite still being a relatively young manager, Smith guided Swindon to a Third Division promotion challenge in his first season in charge - missing out by three points after losing the last two games of the season. His two signings, Alan Mayes and Andy Rowland, formed a deadly strike partnership, and were both selected on the PFA Team of the Year.

The following season Swindon beat Stoke City, Wimbledon and Arsenal to reach the League Cup semi-final. They lost out to Wolverhampton Wanderers when Wolves scored the winner five minutes from the end of the second leg. However Town squandered a promising league position to finish the campaign in tenth place. During the campaign his team recorded an 8–0 win over former club Bury.

Having spent large amounts of money, particularly on £150,000 left-back David Peach and £110,000 midfielder Glenn Cockerill, expectations were high at Swindon for the 1980–81 season. However, Smith was sacked in October 1980 after Swindon lost their first five games and were stuck in the relegation zone. They finished the campaign in 17th place under the stewardship of John Trollope.

Newport County
In 1981, he joined the coaching staff at Blackpool and in July 1982 moved to be a coach at Newport County. He was appointed manager of Newport in June 1985, and kept the club rooted to 18th in the Third Division in 1985–86, before a run of seven straight defeats saw the club hovering above the relegation places and ultimately cost him his job. His replacement John Relish managed to steer the club to safety.

Coaching
He coached Cardiff City between 1989 and July 1990 after being brought to the club by manager Frank Burrows. Later that year he became assistant manager to Colin Addison at Hereford United. He joined the coaching staff at Swansea City in March 1991, and the following year manager Frank Burrows appointed him as his assistant. In October 1995 he became manager of Swansea after the departure of Burrows, but resigned just 80 days later in December of the same year. A playing revolt at Vetch Field led to the resignation of his replacement, Kevin Cullis, before the "Swans" finished 1995–96 in the Second Division relegation zone under the stewardship of Jan Mølby. In 1996 Smith was appointed to the coaching staff at Sheffield Wednesday by David Pleat, where he performed a variety of roles before leaving in the summer of 1999.

Career statistics

Playing statistics
Source:

A.  The "Other" column constitutes appearances and goals in the League Cup, Football League Trophy, Football League play-offs and Full Members Cup.

Managerial statistics
Source:

Honours
Bury
Football League Fourth Division fourth-place promotion: 1973–74

References

1944 births
Living people
People from Prestbury, Cheshire
Sportspeople from Cheshire
English footballers
England schools international footballers
England youth international footballers
Association football inside forwards
Manchester United F.C. players
Scunthorpe United F.C. players
Grimsby Town F.C. players
Brighton & Hove Albion F.C. players
Chester City F.C. players
Hartlepool United F.C. players
Bury F.C. players
English Football League players
Bury F.C. non-playing staff
English football managers
Bury F.C. managers
Port Vale F.C. managers
Swindon Town F.C. managers
Newport County A.F.C. managers
Cardiff City F.C. non-playing staff
Hereford United F.C. non-playing staff
Swansea City A.F.C. non-playing staff
Swansea City A.F.C. managers
English Football League managers
Association football coaches
Sheffield Wednesday F.C. non-playing staff